is a former Japanese football player.

Playing career
Watanabe was born in Tokyo on April 15, 1974. After graduating from Nihon University, he joined J1 League club Urawa Reds in 1997. Although he could not play at all in the match in 1997 season, he debuted in April 1998 and played many matches as center back in 1998 season. However he could not play many matches in 1999 and the club was also relegated to J2 League. He retired end of 1999 season.

Club statistics

References

External links

reds.uijin.com

1974 births
Living people
Nihon University alumni
Association football people from Tokyo
Japanese footballers
J1 League players
Urawa Red Diamonds players
Association football defenders